Cape Sarichef Airport  was a small landing strip located on the western end of Unimak Island in the Aleutian Islands of the U.S. state of Alaska.  It was used to supply and support a United States Coast Guard LORAN station and U.S. Air Force DEW Line site during the Cold War.

It is now a private-use facility owned by the U.S. Fish & Wildlife Service and managed by the Izembek National Wildlife Refuge.

Cape Sarichef was named in 1816 by Russian explorer Otto von Kotzebue after Admiral Gavril Sarychev of the Imperial Russian Navy.

Facilities 
Cape Sarichef Airport has two runways:
 Runway 16/34: 3,500 x 120 ft. (1,067 x 37 m), surface: gravel
 Runway 6/24: 1,900 x 90 ft. (579 x 27 m), surface: gravel

History
The airport was built in 1958 to support Cape Sarichef Air Force Station, a Cold War United States Air Force Distant Early Warning Line radar station.  The station was operated by Detachment 3, 714th Aircraft Control and Warning Squadron based at Cold Bay Air Force Station, near Cold Bay, Alaska.  The radar station was inactivated in September 1969, ending military use of the airport.  The Air Force remediated the site around 2000,  removing all abandoned military structures and returning the site to a natural condition.

References

External links 
Izembek National Wildlife Refuge (U.S. Fish & Wildlife Service - Alaska)
Alaska FAA airport diagram (GIF)
Resources for this airport:

Airports in Aleutians East Borough, Alaska
Unimak Island